Paul Dobbs (5 October 1970 – 10 June 2010) was a motorcycle road racer and development test rider from New Zealand. He first competed in the Isle of Man TT races in 1999.

Racing career
Dobbs' motorcycle racing career included a first place in the Australian 400 Class and Formula 3 in New South Wales in 1997. He competed in the 1998 Australian Championships finishing 2nd and 4th in Class.

In his first attempt at the TT races in 1999 he was awarded the best newcomer in the Lightweight 400 Race. His best finish was sixth in the 400 cc lightweight division of the 2000 races.

Death
He died in a racing accident at Ballagarey, while competing in the Supersport TT race 2 in 2010.

3D documentary Closer to the Edge
The 3D film UK documentary TT3D: Closer to the Edge shot at the 2010 Isle of Man TT races features a cameo with wife Bridget Dobbs about her husband 'Dobsy' and the races.

References

1970 births
2010 deaths
Isle of Man TT riders
Motorcycle racers who died while racing
New Zealand motorcycle racers
Sportspeople from Waikato
Sport deaths in the Isle of Man